The Olympic Medal Nobre Guedes is the most prestigious annual award given by the Olympic Committee of Portugal (COP) to still-active Portuguese sportspeople which stood out for their sporting results and achievements in the previous year. It is named in honour of the former COP president Francisco Nobre Guedes (1957–1968) and has been awarded uninterruptedly since 1951.

List of decorated personalities 

So far, 67 sports personalities have been decorated with this award. Below is a full list.

Awards by sport

References
 

Nobre Guedes, Olympic Medal
Sport in Portugal
Portuguese awards
Portugal at the Olympics